Yakubu Adesokan (born 16 July, 1979) is a Nigerian powerlifter. At the 2012 Summer Paralympics, he won a gold medal in the men's 48 kg powerlifting event, lifting .

References 

Paralympic gold medalists for Nigeria
Powerlifters at the 2012 Summer Paralympics
1979 births
Living people
Medalists at the 2012 Summer Paralympics
Commonwealth Games medallists in weightlifting
Commonwealth Games gold medallists for Nigeria
African Games gold medalists for Nigeria
African Games medalists in weightlifting
Weightlifters at the 2010 Commonwealth Games
Competitors at the 2015 African Games
Paralympic medalists in powerlifting
Paralympic powerlifters of Nigeria
Nigerian powerlifters
Powerlifters at the 2020 Summer Paralympics
20th-century Nigerian people
21st-century Nigerian people
Medallists at the 2010 Commonwealth Games